The Springfield Model 1886 was one of several models of carbines which used the trapdoor breechblock design developed by Erskine S. Allin. It was Springfield Armory's second attempt to create a single longarm that would satisfy the needs of the infantry, cavalry, and artillery (the first attempt being the Springfield Model 1882 short rifle).

History and Design
The Model 1886 carbine featured the new sight created by Lieutenant Colonel Adelbert R. Buffington that had been incorporated into the Springfield Model 1884 rifle. The stock had a storage compartment for a three piece folding cleaning rod and a ruptured case extractor. The upper barrel band also had a curved swivel sling design that allowed it to fit close to the stock when the carbine was placed in a saddle boot. The Model 1886 did not have the lower barrel band that had been present on the Model 1882. The carbine was fitted with a  barrel and a full walnut stock.

Approximately 1,000 carbines were produced and were sent to the field for trials. Like the Model 1882, the Model 1886 performed adequately in field trials, but was not seen as an improvement over existing arms.

See also
 Springfield rifle

References

Springfield firearms
Hinged breechblock rifles
Rifles of the United States